Maryna Kyiko (born 7 January 1987) is a trampoline gymnast from Ukraine.

Maryna competed in the women's trampoline event at the 2012 Summer Olympics where she finished last in 16th place.

References

1987 births
Living people
Ukrainian female trampolinists
Gymnasts at the 2012 Summer Olympics
Olympic gymnasts of Ukraine
World Games bronze medalists
Competitors at the 2013 World Games
Medalists at the Trampoline Gymnastics World Championships
Gymnasts at the 2015 European Games
Gymnasts at the 2019 European Games
European Games medalists in gymnastics
European Games silver medalists for Ukraine
Gymnasts from Kyiv
21st-century Ukrainian women